, also known as  was a Japanese manga artist and historian. He was known for his yōkai manga such as GeGeGe no Kitarō and Akuma-kun, as well as for his war stories based on his own war manga such as Shōwa-shi.

He was born in Osaka, grew up in Sakaiminato, Tottori, then moved to Chōfu, Tokyo, where he remained until his death. His pen-name, Mizuki, comes from the time when he managed an inn called 'Mizuki Manor' while he drew pictures for kamishibai.

Life

Mizuki was born Shigeru Mura in the city of Osaka, the second of three sons. He was raised in the coastal city of Sakaiminato 境港, where he spent much of his childhood as a 'scrapper': picking fights and participating in childish warfare with the neighbouring children. He displayed from an early age a particular talent for art. During his time in elementary school, Mizuki's teachers were so impressed by his skills with a pencil that they organised an exhibition of his work, and he later went on to be featured in the Mainichi newspaper as something of an artistic prodigy. In addition to this penchant for the artistic, Mizuki had an interest in the supernatural - something that was fueled by listening to ghost stories told by a local woman named Fusa Kageyama, but whom the young Mizuki nicknamed "Nononba".

However, in 1942, he was drafted into the Imperial Japanese Army and sent to New Britain Island in Papua New Guinea. His wartime experiences affected him greatly, as he contracted malaria, watched friends die from battle wounds and disease, and dealt with other horrors of war. Finally, in an Allied air raid, he was caught in an explosion and lost his left arm. Regarding this life-changing event, a November 30, 2015 NHK announcement of his death showed excerpts of a video interview with him at age 80, in which he said that as the only survivor of his unit, he was 'ordered to die' — a prospect he considered ridiculous. The result of Mizuki's wartime experience was a concurrent sense of pacifism and goodwill. In the same interview, he explained that his Yōkai characters can be seen only in times of peace, not war, and that he purposely created these supernatural creatures to be of no specific ethnicity or nationality as a hint of the potential for humanity. While in a Japanese field hospital on Rabaul, he was befriended by the local Tolai tribespeople, who offered him land, a home, and citizenship via marriage to a Tolai woman. Mizuki acknowledged that he considered remaining behind, but was shamed by a military doctor into returning home to Japan first for medical treatment to his arm and to face his parents, which he did reluctantly.

Upon arriving home, Mizuki had initially planned to return to New Guinea; however, the occupation of Japan changed that. His injuries did little to help, nor did the fact that his older brother, an artillery officer, was convicted as a war criminal for having prisoners of war executed. After his return to Japan he worked at a variety of jobs including as a fish salesman and kamishibai artist.

In 1957, Mizuki released his debut work, Rocketman. He published numerous works afterwards, both dealing with the military and with yōkai. He has also written many books on both subjects, including an autobiography about his time on New Britain Island and a manga biography of Adolf Hitler in 1971. This book was published in English in 2015 by Drawn & Quarterly.

Mizuki began a rental manga adaptation of the kamishibai  in 1960. In 1965, it was renamed Kappa no Sanpei and began serialization in Weekly Shōnen Magazine, before being renamed again to GeGeGe no Kitarō in 1967.

In 1972 he publishes the gekiga graphic novel Nonnonba about his childhood friendship with old maid and his nanny, who impressed him with the yokai stories.

In 1991, he released a short work titled War and Japan (Sensō to Nippon) published in The Sixth Grader, a popular edutainment magazine for young people, detailing the atrocities committed by the Japanese Army during their rampage in China and Korea and is narrated by Nezumi Otoko. The work serves as a counterpoint to revisionist manga like the works of Yoshinori Kobayashi and by extension a way for Mizuki to express his anger at those responsible for all of Japan's victims. From 1989 until 1998 he worked on Showa: A History of Japan, which follows the same approach and conveys Mizuki's view of the Shōwa era through a mixture of personal anecdotes and summaries of major historical events. His character Nezumi Otoko often appears as the narrator in these works.

When not working in either field, he painted a number of subjects, though these works are not as well known as his literary ones which have made him a household name. In 2003, he returned to Rabaul to rekindle his friendship with the locals, who had named a road after him in his honor.

In 2005, Mizuki appeared in a cameo role in Yōkai Daisenso ("The Great Yokai War") directed by Takashi Miike, a film about Yōkai inspired by his work as well as the work of Aramata Hiroshi. He appears towards the end of the film in the role of the Great Elder Yōkai: a pacifistic character who condemns the warring ways of the film's antagonist and reaffirms the role of Yōkai as peaceful, playful creatures. A brief explanation about his works also is mentioned in the film. In 2010, NHK broadcast an asadora about his married life, Gegege no Nyōbō, based on his wife's autobiography.

Throughout most of his life, Mizuki's work was relatively unknown outside Japan due to not having been translated. This changed in the 2010s when translations in several European languages of his Showa, Kitaro, Nonnonba and Hitler series began to appear, leading to an increasing interest in Mizuki and his work (and that of his gekiga peers) among Westerners.

On November 30, 2015, Mizuki died of heart failure in a Tokyo hospital after collapsing at his home from a heart attack. His Dharma name is 大満院釋導茂 (Daiman-In-Shaku-Domo).

Bakeichōnosei

Bakeichōnosei (ばけいちょうのせい, monster ginkgo spirit) or "Bakeichōnorei"(ばけいちょうのれい) is a Japanese monster written by the yokai manga artist Shigeru Mizuki.

It is said that the limbs and face are yellow, wearing a kimono dyed with inkstick and striking a gong. Ginkgo biloba have long been ominous, and planting them at home is said to cause ominous things.

Mizuki draws this monster picture based on "Kamakura Wakamiya Hachiman Teru (Ginkgo) Teru no Kibana" in Yosa Buson "Kabmura Yokai Emaki". According to yokai researcher Goichi Yumoto, the Kabumura sculpture is said to be an icon of an old tree spirit.

Sakaiminato

Sakaiminato, Mizuki's childhood home, has a street dedicated to the ghosts and monsters that appear in his stories. One hundred bronze statues of the story's characters line both sides of the road. There is also a museum featuring several of his creations and works.

Awards
Mizuki has won numerous awards and accolades for his works, especially GeGeGe no Kitarō. Among these are:
 1965 Received Kodansha Jido Manga Award for Terebi-kun (テレビくん?).
 1990 Received Kodansha Manga Award for Komikku Shōwa-Shi.
 1991 Received Shiju Hōshō Decoration.
 1995 For the 6th Annual Tokyo Peace Day, he was awarded with an exhibition of his paintings, entitled "Prayer for Peace: Shigeru Mizuki War Experience Painting Exhibition"
 1996 Received Minister of Education Award.
 1996 His hometown of Sakaiminato honored him with the Shigeru Mizuki Road, a street decorated with bronze statues of his Ge Ge Ge no Kitaro characters and other designs relating to his works.
 2003 Received Kyokujitsu Shō Decoration.
 2003 Sakaiminato honored him again with the Shigeru Mizuki International Cultural Center.
 2003 Tezuka Osamu Cultural Prize Special Award for his works.
 2007 Received the Best Comic Book award for NonNonBā at the Angoulême International Comics Festival.
 2008 Asahi Prize for contribution to the manga comic culture through portrayals of the horrors of war.
 2010 Received the Person of Cultural Merit award.
 2012 Received the Eisner Award for Onward Towards Our Noble Deaths, in the category Best U.S. Edition of International Material – Asia. The award was shared with translator Zack Davisson

Selected works

in English

Not printed
 War in Japan, 1991 (online readable in the tail of this article by Matthew Penney)
 3, Street of Mysteries (online)
 Wakusei (online)
 "Garo" Keisai Sakuhin (online)

Manga in Japanese

 Rocketman (1957), published in 1958 by Togetsu-Shobō
 Baby Z, for sci-fi magazine Uchū Shonen
 Hakaba Kitaro (1960–1964)
 
 Akuma-kun (1963–1964)
 
 Kaiten, the human torpedo (1967)
  —  a one-shot published in the magazine Comic Mystery about a notebook that killed whoever's name was written in it. The same idea was used in the smashhit manga Death Note by Tsugumi Ohba and Takeshi Obata. Although this fact is a coincidence, Ohba has stated he did not have any particular inspiration for his story.
 Watashi no Hibi (わたしの日々), ("My Days)" (2013, unfinished)

Books
 Colorized Yōkai Gadan, 1992, published by Iwanami Shinsho
 Shigeru Mizuki's Yōkai Artbook: Mujara, 1998
 Mizuki, Shigeru. 水木しげるの日本妖怪めぐり (Hepburn: Mizuki Shigeru no Nihon Yōkai Meguri, lit. "Shigeru Mizuki's Japanese Ghost Tour".)
 Rabauru Senki (Memories of Rabaul)
 Mizuki, Shigeru. "Graphic World of Japanese Phantoms". 講談社, 1985.  (4-06-202381-4)
 Yokaï, Éditions Cornélius, 2017, full color, hardcover, 80 pages. Illustration book.
 À l'intérieur des yôkai, 2018, bi-color, hardcover, 80 pages. Éditions Cornélius. 
 À l’intérieur de Kitaro, hors d'oeuvre publication, bi-color, 16 pages, 2018. Éditions Cornélius.

About Mizuki
 40th Artistic Anniversary, 1990, published by Kagomesha

References

External links

"Drawing from Experience", Japan Times, February 6, 2005, retrieved March 22, 2012.
Mizuki Production Official Website
Sakaiminato: The town where you can meet Kitaro
Shigeru Mizuki Road, Shigeru Mizuki Museum, photos
Japan Focus: War and Japan: The Non-Fiction Manga of Mizuki Shigeru

 
1922 births
2015 deaths
Japanese writers
Manga artists from Tottori Prefecture
Winner of Kodansha Manga Award (General)
Imperial Japanese Army personnel of World War II
Japanese amputees
Japanese pacifists
Winner of Tezuka Osamu Cultural Prize (Special Award)
Persons of Cultural Merit
Recipients of the Medal with Purple Ribbon
GeGeGe no Kitarō